Solonso is a village in the Bana Department of Balé Province in south-western Burkina Faso. The village has a population of 635.

References

Populated places in the Boucle du Mouhoun Region
Balé Province